Dublin Bay South is a parliamentary constituency that has been represented in Dáil Éireann, the lower house of the Irish parliament or Oireachtas, since the 2016 general election. The constituency elects 4 deputies (Teachtaí Dála, commonly known as TDs) on the system of proportional representation by means of the single transferable vote (PR-STV).

History and boundaries
It was established by the Electoral (Amendment) (Dáil Constituencies) Act 2013. The constituency incorporates the entirety of the former Dublin South-East constituency with the addition of territory from Dublin South-Central, centred on Terenure and Harold's Cross. The constituency was named Dublin Bay South for "reasons of symmetry", with the new Dublin Bay North constituency.

The Electoral (Amendment) (Dáil Constituencies) Act 2017 defines the constituency as:

Voting patterns
In 2021, Dublin Bay South had been characterised as a "Fine Gael heartland" by some of the Irish national media, noting the area (as Dublin South-East) was once the seat of Fine Gael leaders John A. Costello and Garret FitzGerald and their historical performance in the area. However, it has also been the seat of party leaders Ruairi Quinn of the Labour Party, Michael McDowell of the Progressive Democrats, John Gormley of the Green Party as well as Eamon Ryan, also of the Green Party. Dublin Bay South has been called "one of the most liberal constituencies in the country" as well as "one of the wealthiest". As Dublin South East, the area had the highest vote against the introduction of the Eighth Amendment in 1983, and in the 2018 referendum it had the highest vote in favour of repealing it. It has been noted that between the Labour Party, the Green Party, the Social Democrats and Democratic Left, centre-left parties have won at least 29% of the vote in every election in the area between 1981 and 2021.

The constituency has been marked by the consistently low-voter turnout, normally coming in at 54%, however, this can be partially attributed to the high rate of residential turnover in the areas of Rathmines and Ranelagh.

As of 2021, half of adults in the constituency have been described as professionals, 57% of individuals have third-level qualifications, and 44% live in privately rented apartments.

TDs

Elections

2021 by-election

A by-election took place on 8 July 2021, to fill the vacancy left by the resignation of Eoghan Murphy.

2020 general election

2016 general election

See also
Elections in the Republic of Ireland
Politics of the Republic of Ireland
List of Dáil by-elections
List of political parties in the Republic of Ireland

References

External links
 Oireachtas Constituency Dashboards
 Oireachtas Members Database

Dáil constituencies
Parliamentary constituencies in County Dublin
Politics of Dublin (city)
2016 establishments in Ireland
Constituencies established in 2016